The Betway Cup is an annual pre-season friendly competition hosted by Premier League club West Ham United. It is sponsored by betting company Betway, who also serve as West Ham United's principal sponsors. 

The inaugural tournament was held in 2015 at West Ham's previous home Upton Park, with the second tournament taking place at the London Stadium in 2016.

Background
Prior to Betway's sponsorship of West Ham United, the club hosted the Out Performance Display Cup, sponsored by the Essex-based signage company of the same name, at Southend United's Roots Hall ground, beating Dutch club 1–0 Vitesse on 9 August 2002. On 1 August 2003, West Ham played PSV Eindhoven at the Boleyn Ground in the second edition of the Out Performance Display Cup, losing 2–1. The pre-season cup ran for two more seasons. In 2008, West Ham played Villarreal in the Bobby Moore Cup in aid of the Bobby Moore Fund for Cancer Research UK. During SBOBET's sponsorship of the club, the bookmaker sponsored West Ham's pre-season tournament ahead of the 2010–11 season. In 2014, Marathonbet sponsored West Ham's annual pre-season home cup game, a 3–2 win against Sampdoria, before Betway's sponsorship of the club.

2015

2016 
West Ham United played reigning Italian champions Juventus at the London Stadium in the official opening of the stadium after being handed to West Ham following the 2012 Summer Olympics, despite playing Slovenian side NK Domžale in the first game at the stadium three days prior in the UEFA Europa League. Juventus striker Simone Zaza scored the winner for the Italian club and signed for West Ham on loan later in August.

2017

First leg

Second leg

2018

2019

2020 
The 2020 edition of the Betway Cup was contested behind closed doors as a result of the COVID-19 pandemic.

2021

References

West Ham United F.C.
Association football competitions in Europe
English football friendly trophies
Recurring sporting events established in 2015
2015 establishments in England